Gift Mbweti (born 6 October 1991) is a Zimbabwean football striker who currently plays for Platinum.

References

1991 births
Living people
Zimbabwean footballers
Hwange Colliery F.C. players
F.C. Platinum players
Zimbabwe international footballers
Association football forwards
Zimbabwe Premier Soccer League players